Florínea is a municipality in the state of São Paulo in Brazil. The population is 2,653 (2020 est.) in an area of 225.66 km². The elevation is 360 m.

References

Municipalities in São Paulo (state)